Nada Laaraj (born 2 September 2000) is a Moroccan taekwondo practitioner. She is a gold medalist in the women's 57 kg event at the African Games, the Islamic Solidarity Games and the African Taekwondo Championships. She also represented Morocco at the 2020 Summer Olympics in Tokyo, Japan.

Career 

In May 2017, she won one of the bronze medals in the women's 57kg event at the 2017 Islamic Solidarity Games held in Baku, Azerbaijan. The following month, she competed in the women's featherweight event at the 2017 World Taekwondo Championships held in Muju, South Korea where she was eliminated in her second match by Jade Jones of Great Britain. At the 2018 African Taekwondo Championships held in Agadir, Morocco, she won the gold medal in the women's 57kg event. In that same year, she was eliminated in her first match in the women's 57kg event at the 2018 Mediterranean Games held in Tarragona, Spain.

In 2019, she competed in the women's featherweight event at the World Taekwondo Championships held in Manchester, United Kingdom. A few months later, she represented Morocco at the 2019 African Games held in Rabat, Morocco and she won the gold medal in the women's 57kg event. In 2020, she competed in the women's 57 kg event at the African Olympic Qualification Tournament in Rabat, Morocco and she qualified to represent Morocco at the 2020 Summer Olympics in Tokyo, Japan.

At the 2021 African Taekwondo Championships held in Dakar, Senegal, she won the silver medal in the women's 57kg event. A few months later, she competed in the women's 57kg event at the 2020 Summer Olympics held in Tokyo, Japan. She lost her first match against Anastasija Zolotic of the United States and she was then eliminated in the repechage by Hatice Kübra İlgün of Turkey.

She competed in the women's 57kg event at the 2022 Mediterranean Games held in Oran, Algeria. She was eliminated in her first match. She also competed in the women's featherweight event at the 2022 World Taekwondo Championships held in Guadalajara, Mexico.

Achievements

References

External links 
 

Living people
2000 births
Place of birth missing (living people)
Moroccan female taekwondo practitioners
Mediterranean Games competitors for Morocco
Competitors at the 2018 Mediterranean Games
Competitors at the 2022 Mediterranean Games
African Games medalists in taekwondo
African Games gold medalists for Morocco
Competitors at the 2019 African Games
African Taekwondo Championships medalists
Taekwondo practitioners at the 2020 Summer Olympics
Olympic taekwondo practitioners of Morocco
21st-century Moroccan women
Islamic Solidarity Games medalists in taekwondo
Islamic Solidarity Games competitors for Morocco